Iain MacInnes is a Scottish folk musician, currently working as the producer of the BBC Radio Scotland bagpipe music program Pipeline.  He was formerly presenter of that program, before taking a one-year sabbatical in 2002 to write a book on piping in the 20th century.  It airs on BBC Radio Scotland at 21:05 GMT on Saturdays.

He has played the Scottish smallpipes and whistles in a number of folk bands including The Tannahill Weavers, Smalltalk, Ossian, and his own band.  He has released a solo CD on Greentrax records called Tryst.

He also writes for the pipes | drums magazine.

Discography
Canterach – Canterach (2001, Lochshore, LDL 1303)
Iain MacInnes – Tryst (1999, Greentrax, CDTRAX 182)
Ossian – The Carrying Stream (1997, Greentrax, CDTRAX 127)
Various – Grand Concert of Scottish Piping (1996, Greentrax, CDTRAX 110)
Smalltalk – Smalltalk (1994, Greentrax, CDTRAX 079)

References

External links
BBC Scotland – Pipeline
Greentrax Records
A review of Tryst

Year of birth missing (living people)
Living people
Scottish radio presenters
Scottish folk musicians
Scottish radio producers
The Tannahill Weavers members